Schneemann is the official mascot of the 1976 Winter Olympics, which were held in Innsbruck, Austria in February 1976. It is also the first official Winter Olympic mascot. The mascot is a Tyrolean snowman called Schneemann ("snowman" in German), created by Walter Pötsch, and represents the Games of Simplicity. The mascot wears a Tyrolean hat which is a typical hat worn in the region of Innsbruck. The public's opinion of this was somewhat divided, but its financial success was indisputable. Schneemann was also considered a lucky charm. At the 1964 Games in Innsbruck, the lack of snow remained ingrained in the memory, and the organisers feared a similar scenario for 1976. But the 1976 Winter Games had plenty of snow.

References

1976 Winter Olympics
Olympic mascots
Fictional Austrian people
Fictional humanoids
Fictional snowmen